George Wilder (9 June 1876 – 10 June 1948) was an English first-class cricketer who played for Sussex and Hampshire County Cricket Clubs.

Wilder made his first-class debut for the Sussex in 1905 against the Marylebone Cricket Club. Wilder would play six matches for Sussex, the last of which came against the Essex in 1906.

Wilder represented the England XI against Hambledon in a commemorative first-class match in 1908. In 1909 Wilder played one County Championship match for Hampshire against Derbyshire. It was during his final match that Wilder took his best first-class bowling figures, taking 3/14.

Wilder was still active in his home town of Emsworth in 1906, when he laid a stone in the then under-construction Emsworth Post Office. The inscription on the stone suggests that Wilder was living at Stansted House at the time.

Wilder died a day after his 72nd birthday, on 10 June 1948 at Las Vegas, United States.

External links

1876 births
People from Stoughton, West Sussex
English cricketers
Sussex cricketers
Hampshire cricketers
1948 deaths
Non-international England cricketers
English cricket administrators
English expatriates in the United States